The Red Rope is a 1937 American Western film directed by S. Roy Luby and written by George H. Plympton. The film stars Bob Steele, Lois January, Forrest Taylor, Charles King, Karl Hackett and Bobby Nelson. The film was released on July 19, 1937, by Republic Pictures.

Plot

Tom Shaw’s plans to marry Betty Duncan encounter a hitch when known outlaw Rattler Haynes threatens the property and doesn’t allow the wedding guests to attend. With the help of his friends and some unexpected allies, will Tom be able to wed his love and bring peace to the frontier?

Cast 
Bob Steele as Tom Shaw
Lois January as Betty Duncan
Forrest Taylor as Parson Pete
Charles King as Red Mike
Karl Hackett as Grant Brade
Bobby Nelson as Jimmy Duncan
Ed Cassidy as Logan 
Lew Meehan as Rattler Haynes
Frank Ball as John Duncan
Jack Rockwell as Dotkins
Horace Murphy as Horner

References

External links 

1937 films
American Western (genre) films
1937 Western (genre) films
Republic Pictures films
American black-and-white films
Films directed by S. Roy Luby
Films based on works by Johnston McCulley
Films with screenplays by George H. Plympton
1930s English-language films
1930s American films